The 2022–23 Maryland Terrapins men's basketball team represents the University of Maryland, College Park in the 2022–23 NCAA Division I men's basketball season. They are led by first-year head coach Kevin Willard. They play their home games at Xfinity Center in College Park, Maryland, as members of the Big Ten Conference.

Previous season
The Terrapins finished the 2021–22 season 15–17, 7–13 in Big Ten play to finish in a three-way tie for 10th place. As the No. 10 seed in the Big Ten tournament, they lost to Michigan State in the second round.

On December 3, 2021, head coach Mark Turgeon and the school announced that the parties had mutually agreed that Turgeon would step down as head coach effective immediately. Danny Manning, who had been hired as an assistant prior to the season, was named the interim head coach for the remainder of the season. On March 21, 2022, the school named Seton Hall head coach Kevin Willard the team's new head coach.

Offseason

Player departures

Incoming transfers

Recruiting classes

2022 recruiting class

2023 recruiting class

Roster

Schedule and results
Source

|-
!colspan=9 style=| Regular season

|-
!colspan=9 style=|Big Ten tournament

|-
!colspan=12 style=""| NCAA tournament

Rankings

*AP does not release post-NCAA Tournament rankings.

References

Maryland Terrapins men's basketball seasons
Maryland
Maryland Terrapins Men's Basketball Team
Maryland Terrapins Men's Basketball Team
Maryland